Kentucky Afield is a magazine, radio show and television program, and is the official publication of the Kentucky Department of Fish and Wildlife Resources. The magazine is a quarterly periodical while the television and radio programs are a 30-minute broadcast, all of which is devoted to the fish and wildlife resources of Kentucky and covers a broad range of outdoor topics, including angling, hunting, conservation and land management.

The television show is the longest continuously-running outdoors television show in the United States and the fourth oldest in the nation for all television shows.

Magazine

Kentucky Afield magazine began as Kentucky Happy Hunting Ground under the leadership of Editor Harry Towles in December 1945 as a bi-monthly publication. The initial press run was 15,000 copies, with the subscription price set at 50 cents a year. The first issue featured a hunting dog on the cover and a drawing of pioneer Daniel Boone in the upper left hand corner.  The League of Kentucky Sportsmen (Kentucky's oldest conservation group) took over the magazine from May 1947 to June 1948, before giving it back to the Department.

In 1992, the magazine's name changed to Kentucky Afield. The name change not only mirrored the names of the department's television and radio shows, but it emphasized all the outdoors, not just hunting. Since 2000, staff artist Rick Hill has painted the covers of the magazine. The exception was 2004, when the magazine switched to photo covers while Hill painted "Kentucky Fish", a department poster featuring 27 of the state's most recognized fish.

Radio

A radio program was added in 1952.

Television

The radio program was followed by a television show in 1953 when it debuted on WAVE TV. Ron Rhody delivered a weekly fishing report on Saturday mornings. In 1957, Hope Carleton, who was a Kentucky Department of Fish and Wildlife Resources conservation officer, was named host and remained so until his retirement in 1980. He was replaced with Jeremy Dreier.

In 1985, Dreier forged a deal with Kentucky Educational Television to air the show statewide. Dreier was replaced as host by Tim Michaels in 1988 and then Dave Shuffett from 1989 until 1995. Under Dave, the format of the show changed into a magazine-styled format. Tim Farmer took over from Dave from 1995 until December 2015.

See also
 Kentucky Life
 Kentucky Monthly

References

Further reading
 Kentucky Afield

Quarterly magazines published in the United States
American news radio programs
English-language television shows
Magazines established in 1952
Magazines published in Kentucky
1952 establishments in Kentucky
Kentucky Educational Television